Sacred Heart of Jesus School  was the Catholic school of Sacred Heart of Jesus Parish in Du Quoin, Illinois, United States. Opened circa 1892, it was closed in 2008 by Father Jerome.

Notable alumni
 Ewald Pyle, Former MLB pitcher (Saint Louis Browns, Washington Senators, New York Giants, Boston Braves)

Defunct Catholic schools in the United States
Defunct schools in Illinois
Schools in Perry County, Illinois
Educational institutions disestablished in 2008